Sutonocrea lobifer is a moth in the family Erebidae. It was described by Gottlieb August Wilhelm Herrich-Schäffer in 1855. It is found in French Guiana, Brazil, Ecuador, Bolivia, Panama and Costa Rica.

References

Moths described in 1855
Phaegopterina
Arctiinae of South America